The Spanish missions in Georgia comprised a series of religious outposts established by Spanish Catholics in order to spread the Christian doctrine among the Guale and various Timucua peoples in southeastern Georgia.

Beginning in the second half of the 16th century, the Kingdom of Spain established a number of missions throughout Spanish Florida in order to convert the Native Americans to Christianity, to facilitate control of the area, and to prevent its colonization by other countries, in particular, England and France. Spanish Florida originally included much of what is now the Southeastern United States, although Spain never exercised long-term effective control over more than the northern part of what is now the State of Florida from present-day St. Augustine to the area around Tallahassee, southeastern Georgia, and some coastal settlements, such as Pensacola, Florida. A few short-lived missions were established in other locations, including Mission Santa Elena in present-day South Carolina, around the Florida peninsula, and in the interior of Georgia and Alabama.

Peoples of the missions
The missions of what is now southeastern Georgia originally served Guale speakers and one or more chiefdoms of Timucua speakers. The Spanish divided Spanish Florida in regions they called "provinces", based mainly on the language or dialect spoken by the inhabitants. Provinces in Spanish records grew and contracted over time, and were sometimes referred to by different names. At the time of the first recorded European visits to the Georgia coast, the Guale people lived north of the Altamaha River on the present-day Georgia Sea Islands and adjacent coast north to St. Catherines Sound. (There is no record of people living at that time in the area north of St. Catherines Sound to the Savannah River.) South of the Guale were various Timucua peoples. The coast from the Altamaha River to St. Augustine was originally called "San Pedro". By the middle of the 17th century, that province became known as "Mocama", and was later subsumed into Guale Province. Within San Pedro Province were several provinces corresponding to sub-groups of the Timucua. On the mainland south of the Altamaha River down to the Satilla River were the Cascangue and Icafui people. While some sources list these as separate tribes, due to some confusion in Spanish records, both groups spoke the Icafi (or Itafi) dialect of the Timucua language and were otherwise closely related. The Yufera people, who spoke their own dialect of Timucuan, lived inland of the Cascangue/Icafui and on the mainland west of Cumberland Island (which the Spanish called San Pedro Island). The Ibi (or Yui), who also spoke the Icafi dialect of the Timucua language, lived west of the Yufera, from the portion of the Satilla River that runs north–south to the Okefenokee Swamp, and south of the east–west trending upper reaches of the Satilla River down to near the St. Marys River. A group speaking the Oconi (or Ocone) dialect of Timucua may have lived on the margin of the Okefenokee Swamp. Those Ocone appear to have been distinct from the Hitchiti-speaking Oconee, who lived on the Oconee River and later, the Chattahoochee River. The Tacatacuru chiefdom, whose people spoke the Mocama dialect of Tumucuan, was centered on Cumberland Island, but extended north to St. Simons Island and south to Fort George Island in Florida. The people of the Arapaha chiefdom, on the Alapaha River in interior southern Georgia, spoke the "Timucua proper" dialect of Timucuan. Later in the 17th century, Yamassee people, under pressure from other native groups allied with the English of the Province of Carolina, pushed into Guale Province, and some of them joined the Spanish missions.

Missions
Missions in Spanish Florida were initially organized around the existing native political groupings. Typically, five to ten towns or villages would be associated in a chiefdom, with one of the towns serving as the seat of the chief. Two or more of the chiefdoms might be allied, sometimes with one of the chiefs acting as a paramount chief over other chiefdoms. Mission stations of two types were established by Spanish missionaries. Doctrinas were stations with a resident missionary, usually in the chief town of a chiefdom. A doctrina typically included a church, a residence for the missionary, and a kitchen. Visitas were stations with a cross and some sort of rudimentary chapel, often open-air, in outlying villages, which were visited by a missionary, but had no resident missionary. Churches at doctrinas typically had wood posts supporting a roof of thatch over a clay floor. Plank and wattle and daub walls often enclosed at least part of the church. While missionaries conducted some services at visitas, converted residents of visita villages would go to the doctrina on important feast days. In 1620, 32 doctrinas in Spanish Florida served more than 200 towns and villages. Native populations declined throughout the mission period in Spanish Florida. By the 1630s, all of the surviving residents of outlying villages in Mocama Province had been relocated to the principal town of a chiefdom, and the visitas were abandoned. Spanish soldiers were sometimes stationed at missions to protect them from pirates and from English and French raids. The missionaries reported that the soldiers interfered with their work by acting inappropriately with the natives. Converted natives received a Christian name at baptism, and adopted at least some Christian customs. Many also learned Spanish.

Tribute
When Pedro Menéndez de Avilés expelled the French from Florida and established St. Augustine, he lacked the strength to conquer the chiefdoms of Florida, and was restricted by King Phillip II from exploiting the natives. He proclaimed Phillip overlord of Florida, and persuaded native chiefs friendly to the Spanish to pay tribute through him to Phillip. The Spanish missionaries and civil authorities extracted various levels of tribute from the people brought under the mission system. While Menéndez de Avilés was adelantado of Florida, the chiefdoms were required to feed Spanish personnel when they were traveling through the area. Tacatscuru increased its production of maize after the mission of San Pedro de Mocama was founded there. The chiefdom was a source of maize for St. Augustine when supplies ran short there. In 1592, the Spanish purchased 263 arrobas [] of maize from the chief. In 1595, Governor Domingo Martínez de Avendaño required the missions to provide the Spanish with one arroba []  of maize for every married man in the mission. When Governor Gonzalo Méndez de Canço requested that the people at mission San Pedro de Mocama move closer to St. Augustine after the Guale Rebellion, he reduced the mission's tribute to six ears of maize.

The towns also had to provide laborers from time to time for Spanish needs. Native workers were important to the crops grown around St. Augustine. While Spanish soldiers worked in the fields, they were unable to grow and harvest sufficient crops without the labor of natives. Governor Canço was criticized for paying native laborers directly (with red cloth) for their work on a Spanish fort, when they had formerly been paid only with some maize and some iron tools for their chiefs.

Beginnings and losses
After French Huguenots under René Goulaine de Laudonnière established Fort Caroline on the St. Johns River in 1564, Phillip II, King of Spain, commissioned Pedro Menéndez de Avilés to drive the French out of Florida and to provide missionaries to the native inhabitants of Florida. In 1565, de Avilés founded St. Augustine and defeated the French. He quickly established a number of strong points, or presidios along the coast from Santa Elena in South Carolina down the length of the Florida peninsula and up the Gulf coast of Florida to Tampa Bay. Two of the presidios were in what is now the state of Georgia, on Guale (St. Catherines) Island (abandoned after three months) and at the Tacatacuru chiefdom on Cumberland (San Pedro) Island (abandoned in 1573). De Avilés had only four priests in his initial company, and three of those ministered to the garrisons at St. Augustine, Santa Elena, and San Mateo (on the site of the captured Fort Caroline). De Avilés asked the Society of Jesus to send missionaries to convert the natives. In the meantime, he appointed particularly pious lay persons at each presidio to instruct the natives on Christianity. De Aviles sent a secular priest to the town of Guale in 1566 to preach to the natives, but that priest was soon recalled and sent to Santa Elena. All of the presidios, except for St. Augustine and Santa Elena, were abandoned within four years. The first Jesuit missionaries arrived in Florida in 1566, soon followed by others. Jesuits started missions at the towns of Guale (on St. Catherines Island) and Tupiqui. Jesuit missionaries to the Guale complained that it was difficult to convert the natives to Christianity because they did not remain resident in one place, but moved to be near food resources as they became seasonally available. A Jesuit missionary, Father Pedro Martinez, and three companions attempted to establish a mission at Tacatacuru that year, but all four were killed by the Tacatacuru. Discouraged by the killings at Tacatacuru and a lack of progress in converting the Guale, the Jesuits withdrew from the Georgia coast and, in 1570, established the Ajacán Mission in what is now the state of Virginia. All of those missionaries were killed a few months later. The surviving Jesuit missionaries were withdrawn from Spanish Florida in 1572. There are indications that a Franciscan friar was resident in Tupiqui on the Sapelo River in 1569–1570, and that in the 1570s Theatine friars established a mission in the town of Guale, but little has been found about those missions in Spanish records.

Before de Avilés left Florida for the final time in 1572, he requested missionaries be sent by the Franciscans. The first Franciscan friars arrived at Santa Elena in 1573, and over the next few years a few Franciscans served in Spanish Florida, primarily in the garrison towns of St. Augustine and Santa Elena. Four Franciscan priests arrived in Florida in 1584, and another twelve arrived in Spanish Florida in 1587, one year after the presidio and town at Santa Elena had been abandoned. The Franciscan missionaries were assigned to native towns, primarily near St. Augustine, but including a mission on Cumberland Island, San Pedro de Mocama, established in 1587. Few of those Fransciscans remained in Spanish Florida for very long, with only five left in 1592. More Franciscans arrived in 1595, and six more missions were established that year along the Georgia coast, including at Puturiba near the northern end of Cumberland Island (in Mocama Province), and five in Guale Province, at Tupiqui on the Sapelo River, Asao at the mouth of the Altamaha River, Talapo (or Ospo) on the mainland near Sapelo Island, Tolomato on the mainland near St. Catherines Island, and on Guale (St. Catherines) Island. Another mission was established in Ibi (Yui) Province the following year. In 1597, the Spanish visited Tama, their name for the area west of Guale Province. Gonzalo Méndez de Canço, governor of Florida, proposed establishing a mission in Tama, but was refused permission to do so because the area was considered to be too far from St. Augustine.

Nuestra Señora de Guadalupe de Tolomato was in a Guale town on the mainland north of Asao and Talaxe. The Franciscan friar Pedro Corpa arrived in Spanish Florida in 1587, and may have been resident at Tolomato beginning in that year. Corpa was the resident missionary at Tolomato in 1597 when the Guale Uprising started, and was the first of the missionaries killed by the rebels. Some of the residents of Tolomato may have settled in Espogache by the time a mission was established there.

Tupiqui was a Guale town three leagues north of Tolomato on the mainland. Jesuit missionaries tried to establish a mission there in 1569–1570, but left in the general withdrawal from Guale. The mission of Santa Clara was established there in 1595. The Franciscan friar Blas Rodríguez was killed in the Guale Uprising, and the mission was destroyed. Tupiqui may have been rebuilt after 1603, and Tupiqui and Espogache may have been merged. The mission in Tupiqui did not have a resident priest in 1606, and was served by the missionary at Talaxe. Espogache had a church in 1606, but not a priest. Espogache is not mentioned in Spanish records after 1606. A missionary was resident at the Santa Clara mission in 1616, but the mission does not appear in Spanish records after that year. In 1677 some of the former residents of Tupiqui were living at Zapala, while many had joined other Guale and Yamassee who moved to English-held territory.

Ospo or Talapo/Tulapo was a Guale town in the northern part of Guale province. The Franciscan missionary in Ospo in 1697 was Francisco Dávila. He was the only missionary in Guale to survive the Uprising, but was held captive and abused for ten months. Ospo and Talapo are not mentioned in Spanish records after 1606. A cacique named Antonio Hospo, living among Guale people on Amelia Island in 1695, may have been a survivor of the residents of Ospo.

Guale uprising
In 1597, the missions in Guale Province suffered a disaster known as the Guale Uprising or Juanillo Revolt. Juanillo was a Guale in Tolomato, who had been converted to Christianity, but refused to give up his multiple wives. When Fray Pedro de Corpa, the friar at the mission, tried to force Juanillo to be monogamous, Juanillo, along with two other Guale men who resented the missionary's attempts to suppress polygamy, killed him. Other villages joined the rebellion, and four other missionaries were also killed. The missionary at Talapo (Ospo), escaped death, but was enslaved and physically abused for ten months before being rescued. A Guale war party tried to attack the Mocama missions on Cumberland Island, but the presence of a Spanish ship anchored near the island may have discouraged most of the Guale, who turned back. Only a small party of Guale men entered the mission village. They were discovered before they could kill anyone and were driven off. The mission effort on the Georgia coast was greatly reduced. The friar at Puturiba was sent to Spain to report on the killing of the friars. The missions in Guale Province had been destroyed in the revolt, and missionaries did not return to Guale Province for several years. The friar at Tacatacuru, and at least some of the Christianized Mocama on Cumberland Island, including their chief, were evacuated to St. Augustine after the Guale Uprising, but had returned to the island in about six months. The mission at Ibi was also abandoned, but Ibi people visited towns near San Pedro. Guale attacked Cumberland Island again later that year (1598), burning some villages and killing three people.

Return to Guale
While some of the friars left Florida after the Guale Uprising, others expressed confidence in the progress of missions in other provinces. The mission of San Pedro on Cumberland Island served seven towns on the island, with 384 baptized converts, and many others were receiving instruction in the faith. The Franciscans also reported that there were 1,200 converts in Guale Province who could be won back if the province could be brought under Spanish control again. Peace was restored in Guale in 1603, and new missions had been established at San Joseph de Zapala on Sapelo Island, San Buenaventura de Guadalquini on St. Simons Island, and Santa Catalina de Guale on St. Catherines Island by the end of that year. In 1606, Juan de las Cabezas Altamirano, bishop of the Diocese of Santiago de Cuba (whose see was in Havana), visited Florida and confirmed 1,652 native converts in Guale Province.

Some sources state there was a mission on St. Catherines Island in 1587, although Hann notes that a report from 1588 stated that there were no missions on the Georgia coast north of San Pedro de Mocama on Cumberland Island. A mission was established at the Village of Asopo on the island in 1595, but abandoned two years later when both of the resident friars were killed in the Guale Uprising. Asopo was not the chief town of the island, and its location is not known. When Franciscan missionaries returned to St. Catherines Island, a church was built at the chief's town in 1604, but Fray Pedro de Ibarra did not take up residence there until the next year. The mission was an important source of food for St. Augustine until it was abandoned. The Spanish and Guale successfully repelled an attack on the mission by English and Yamassee forces in 1680, but the mission was then abandoned, and many of the mission residents moved south. A site on Wamassee Creek in the middle part of the west side of the island has been identified as the location of the mission.

The Guale towns of Asao (or Asaho) and Talaxe were on the mainland near the mouth of the Altamaha River in the later part of the 16th century. A Franciscan mission was established in Asao in 1595, and abandoned in 1597 after the resident friar was killed in the Guale Uprising. A new mission, San Domingo, was established in Asaho by 1604. Asao and Talaxe apparently merged at some point, as the mission was later referred to alternately as San Domingo de Asao and San Domingo de Talaxe (or Talaje). Bishop Altamitano confirmed 268 Guale converts at the mission in 1606. A Spanish report indicates that the British Fort King George was built on the former site of Talaxe. Sometime before 1675, the mission was moved to St. Simons Island, with about 30 inhabitants, where it was still known as San Domingo de Asaho or Asajo. In the 1680s, as the mission system in Georgia collapsed, some of the towns residents joined the Yamassee at the "Scotch colony at Santa Elena", while others moved to Amelia Island, where a town was briefly called Asao or Tupique.

A mission called San Pedro de Atulteca was established by 1616 in the Guale town of Tuluteca, which was (presumably) on the mainland four leagues north of the mission of Santa Catalina de Guale on St. Catherines Island. The mission also appears on a list in 1647, but in 1655 had changed to San Felipe. Sometime before 1675, the mission had moved to Cumberland Island, which no longer had any Mocama residents. It retained the same name, and was called Señor San Felipe Althuluteca in 1680. Further troubles caused the mission to move again in the 1680s to the southern end of Amelia Island in the present-day state of Florida.

The mission of San Felipe de Alabe was reported in 1616, located north of Tupique. It was one of the most northern of Guale missions in Georgia. A mission of San Felipe was present in 1655. Hann states that there may have been a fusion between San Felipe de Alabe and San Pedro de Atulteca that resulted in the mission of San Felipe de Athulutheca.

A mission of San Diego de Satuache, first noted in 1616, may have been the northernmost mission in Guale province. Lanning placed Satuache near the mouth of the Edisto River, in South Carolina. Worth places Satuache near the mouth of the Ogeechee River. In 1662 Chicimeco attacked the town of Huyache, which was about five leagues north of Satuache and did not have a mission. The residents of Satuache then moved south to Santa Catalina de Guale on St. Catherines Island. They remained part of the Santa Catalina community through two more moves southwards.

The mission of Santa Isabel de Utinahica was located at the junction of the Ocmulgee and Oconee rivers.

People called "Chisca" by the Spanish, who Hann believes later become known as Yuchis, attacked western Timucua and Apalachee missions around 1650. In 1651 Governor Vallecilla sent a Spanish soldier to Guale to determine if Chiscas were threatening that province. At least one patrol by Spanish soldiers and Guale warriors fought Chiscas and chased them away from Guale.

People that the Spanish called "Chichimeco", likely the Westo, threatened the Guale missions in 1661. There may have been a confrontation between Spanish soldiers and the Chichimeco, resulting in the capture of some Chichimeco.

Timucuan missions
In 1602, San Pedro de Mocama was reported to have 300 resident Christians, while 792 were reported to attend mass there on major feast days. A number of visitas were recorded as attached to San Pedro early in the 17th century, on San Pedro (Cumberland) Island and elsewhere. Puturiba, where a mission had been established in 1595, was listed as a visita with a church building under San Pedro. Olatayco and Alatico were reported as visitas under San Pedro in 1604, with a church located at Olatayco. The two places appear to have been adjacent to each other, or the names may have been variant names for the same place. Hann suggests that "Olacayco" was based on "Holato" (chief) "Yco". Hann quotes Deagan as saying Olacayco/Alatico were "probably Cascange towns". By 1603 the church at San Pedro was old enough that the governor proposed building a new church. Bishop Altamirano visited the mission at San Pedro in 1606, confirming natives on both visits. San Pedro was named as a mission with a resident friar in 1655. There is some evidence that the San Pedro mission was moved south into what is now Florida sometime between 1650 and 1675. and that the mission San Felipe de Athuluteca was later established on its old site. A site near the south end of Cumberland Island, on Dungeness plantation, has been identified as the probable site of Tacatacuru, the town in which San Pedro was situated, but the site of the mission appears to have eroded away.

San Buenaventura de Guadalquini was a mission on St. Simon's Island. Guadalquini was first mentioned in Spanish records in 1606, while the mission of San Buenaventura was first mentioned in 1609. While some authors have placed San Buenaventura de Guadalquini on Jekyll Island, and considered its residents to be Guale, Hann notes that no Spanish records identified them as Guale, and records from the middle of the 17th century clearly show them to have been Mocama. Guadalquini was near the southern end of St. Simon's Island, with the rest of the island occupied by Guale people. Ashley, et al. suggest that all of St. Simon's Island was originally occupied by Guale, but that Mocama had displaced them from the southern end of the island after the Guale Uprising.

In 1602, a couple of missionaries visited five villages with a total of 700 to 800 inhabitants in Ibi Province, but the first mention of an established mission in the province, San Lorenzo de Ibihica (hica was Timucuan for "village", so Ibihica meant "village of Ibi"), was in 1630. Hann believes that the mission was established in 1612 or soon thereafter, as additional Franciscan missionaries entered Florida that year. There is no mention of a mission in Ibi after 1630 (the next list of missions after 1630 was in 1655).

Also in 1602, a missionary visited Cascangue (also called Ycafui), which had about 1,100 people in seven or eight villages. Another missionary visited the Ocone, who were described as living on an island in a laguna, which may mean a lake, pond, or lagoon. Hann concludes that they lived on the eastern edge of the Okefenokee Swamp. While some of the people in those provinces were interested in learning about Christianity, and sometimes visited friends in towns that did have missions, there were no missionaries available at the time to take up residence in those provinces. The Cascangue/Ycafui do not appear in Spanish records after 1602.

A missionary apparently was assigned to the Ocone by 1645, although there is no name given for the mission. That year, Governor Benito Ruíz de Salazar Vallecilla ordered that the Ocone be relocated to San Diego de Laca, on the St. Johns River. That village was responsible for providing ferry services across the river as part of the trail connecting St. Augustine with Apalachee Province. There is no record of any of the Ocone being moved to San Diego de Laca, however. The mission Santiago de Ocone appears only on a 1655 list of missions visited by an official. That year, Governor Diego de Rebolledo ordered the people of Ocone and neighboring villages to move to the mission of Nombre de Dios near St. Augustine, which had lost most of its population. When the chief of Ocone asked for a delay until their crops had been harvested, the governor sent soldiers to seize the chief, burn the villages, and force the people to move to St. Augustine. However, most of the people fled to the woods, while a few may have taken refuge at the San Pedro mission. Ocone disappeared from Spanish records after this.

Known records are sparse for Mocama Province between 1609 and 1655. The Mocamas may have been hard hit by edidemics that struck Spanish Florida in 1614 through 1617. There is one report of Spanish soldiers being sent into Mocama Province in 1622 or 1623 to round up Christian natives who had fled the missions to live in the woods (called Indios Simarrones), and return them to the missions. Later in the 1620s, a Spanish expedition found that all canoes had been removed from crossing places normally used for travel in the province.

In the middle of the 17th century the mission towns of San Pedro de Mocama and San Buenaventura de Guadalquini were responsible for providing transportation by canoe, if needed, and food to Spanish officials and soldiers travelling along the coast between St. Augustine and Guale Province.

The mission at San Pedro de Mocama last appeared in Spanish records in 1655. A smallpox epidemic in Spanish Florida that year may have largely eliminated the population of the mission, with any survivors relocated closer to St. Augustine. By 1675 it was reported that only Yemassee lived on St. Catherines Island, while the inhabitants of Nombre de Dios mission near St. Augustuine were described as being Mocama.

In 1674, the bishop of Santiago de Cuba, the diocess that included Spanish Florida, visited the missions in Florida, including four along the Georgia coast; San Felipe on Cumberland Island, Santa Buenaventura de Guadalquini on Jekyll Island, Santo Domingo de Asahó on St. Simons Island, San José de Zapala on Sapelo Island, and Santa Catalina on St.Catherines Island.

"San Pedro became Santa Clara de Tupiqui in the 1690s."

The mission of Santa María de Los Angeles de Arapaha had been established by 1830 on the Alapaha River. After the Timucuan Rebellion of 1656, Governor Robelledo order the people of Arapaha be moved to the mission Santa Fé de Potano along the trail connecting Sy. Augustine to Apalachee Province. The mission of Santa Fé had lost most of its population, and its chief had been executed following the Timucua Rebellion. Most of the people transferred to Santa Fé from Arapaha soon fled to the woods, as the population of Santa Fé was depleted again by 1659, but the mission at Arapaha disappeared from Spanish records.

The mission of Santa Cruz de Cachipile was established by 1655, in the drainage basin of the Altamaha River. The mission was no longer mentioned after 1657.

Retreat
The establishment of an English colony at Charles Town in 1670 eventually resulted in severe disruption to the missions in Spanish Florida. The English traded firearms and other manufactured goods in exchange for skins to the Muscogee and Yamassee peoples, who in turn began attacking the missions of Spanish Florida. In 1680, a Muscogee war party attacked the mission of Santiago de Ocone on Jekyll Island, but was repelled. A party of 300 warriors led by English officers attacked the mission town of Santa Catalina on St. Catherines Island, but six Spanish soldiers and 16 Guale musketeers successfully defended the mission. Following the attacks, the governor of Spanish Florida ordered a withdrawal from the northern part of Guale Province, including the native residents of the mission towns. The Guale did not want to leave, and many fled into the woods, some even joining the raiding Muscogee and Yamassee. By 1684 most of the northern Guale had gone over to the English side. At the same time, pirates began raiding the remaining Spanish missions along the Georgia coast. The Spanish were unable to protect the missions from the English, their native allies, and the pirates. By 1686, all of the Spanish missions north of the St. Marys River had been abandoned.

The people of Santa Isabel de Utinahica were moved to St. Simons Island in the middle of the 17th century. The declining Oconi population was bolstered by moving other Timucua people from southern Georgia to the mission. The mission of Santa María de los Angeles de Arapaje was listed in the 1630s in the Arapaha chiefdom. Some time between 1630 and 1655 the Oconi and Ibihica missions were merged. The Spanish later ordered the combined Ibi and Oconi to move to the coast. When they refused, the Spanish destroyed the town. Timucua people living around the Alapaha, Oconee and Ocmulgee rivers may have been moved south to missions along the mission road in northern Florida that connected St. Augustine and Apalachee Province.

San Pedro de Mocama last appeared in Spanish records in 1655. Guales and Yamassees moving south along the coast may have pushed the Timucuan Mocamas to move south soon after that date, perhaps to Amelia Island.

Yamassee people were forced out of Tama Province by raids conducted by Westo, and settled in or near mission towns.

San Pedro do Mocama mission appeared on Spanish lists until 1659. The mission of San Phelipe (or Felipe) de Athulteca was established by 1675. The original inhabitants of Cumberland Island had probably been evacuated by then, and the island reinhabited by heathens. Mission San Pedro de Potohiriba (possibly an alternate form of Puturibe) was established in western Timucua Province by 1657, probably serving Yamassee. In 1605 there were 300 Christians in San Pedro Province (partly in Florida), with 308 being confirmed in 1606 by Bishop Altamirano. The Guale mission of Nuestra Señora Guadalupe de Tolomato was moved to near St. Augustine in 1658. The Salamototo mission was moved to the site of an old Saturiwa town in 1658. No mention of Guale in Spanish records after 1735.

Just 70 Mocamas were reported as living at two missions in 1675, San Buenaventura de Guadalquini and San Juan del Puerto on the St. Johns River in present-day Florida.

Missions in 1675
San Felipe was a mission on Cumberland Island listed in 1676. It was probably located on the former site of San Pedro de Mocama. Hann suggests that the inhabitants of the mission were Christianized Guale and pagan Yamassee, with the former Mocaman residents having moved south to what is now Florida.

San Buenaventura de Guadalquini, St. Simons Island, Timucua
Santo Domingo de Asaho, St. Simons Island, Guale

Native peoples to the north of Guale Province, armed and encouraged by the English in the Province of Carolina, attacked the missions at Guadalquini and Santa Catalina in 1680. Another attack on missions in Georgia occurred in 1684. As a result, all of the Spanish missions in Gulae were withdrawn, and by 1685 there were no missions remaining north of the St. Marys River. Residents of the mission towns, as well as  unconverted Yamassees, who often established towns near the missions, were scattered. Some were resettled in missions closer to St. Augustine, some retreated into the woods, some were captured and sold as slaves in Charleston, and some joined the native allies of the English.

The attacks on the missions in 1680 were carried out by about 300 Chichimeco, Uchise, and Chiluque warriors, aided by English instructors (likely helping with the provision and maintenance of firearms). The force initially attacked the town of Colon on St. Simons Island, which was inhabited by heathen (un-Christianized) natives, killing some of the inhabitants. Spanish and Mocamas from the nearby mission of San Buenaventura de Guadalquini went the aid of Colon, and drove the attackers away. The same group attacked the mission of Santa Catalina de Guale on St. Catherines Island a few days later.

Pirates attacked St. Augustine in 1683. After that attack failed the pirates sacked several missions and other towns along the coast north of St. Augustine, mainly in present-day Florida, but including the mission of San Phelipe on Cumberland Island. The Spanish government began planning to move the remaining missions along the Georgia coast closer to St. Augustine. Before the missions could be moved, pirates returned to the area in 1684. Learning of the pirates' presence, most of the people of Guadalquini moved to the mainland, taking most of their food stores with them, and left ten men under a sub-chief to defend the town. When the pirates arrived at Guadalquini, the defending force retreated to the woods. The pirates burned the church and convent (priest's house) and left. The mission was then moved to a site on the north side of the St. Johns River (in present-day Florida), which was named Santa Cruz de Guadalquini.

Sabacola
Late in the mission period Spanish missionary activity briefly entered what is now southwestern Georgia. The town of Sabacola, or Sabacola el Menor, located just below where the Chattahooche and Flint rivers join to form the Apalachicola River, was the site of a mission called La Encarnation a la Santa Cruz, or just Santa Cruz, from 1674 to 1677. Fearing attack from the Chisca in western Florida, with whom the Apalachee were fighting, the inhabitants of Sabacola moved north, probably in 1677. A new town of Sabacola el Grande was founded on the Chattahooche River a few leagues south of the falls at present-day Columbus, which was in the territory of the Lower Towns of the Muscogee Confederacy. Some residents of Sabacola had become Christians when the town was located in Florida, and requested that missionaries be sent to them. Spanish missionaries attempted to establish a mission in Sabacola in 1697. The Christians of Sabacola had not informed the chief of Coveta, one of the four "mother towns" of the Muscogee Confederacy, of the request. On hearing of the arrival of the missionaries, the chief traveled to Sabacola and forced the missionaries to leave three days later. Juan Márquez Cabrera, who had become governor of Spanish Florida in 1680, sent missionaries back to Sabacola in 1681, with an escort of seven Spanish soldiers. The missionaries baptized 36 residents of Sabacola before being forced out again a few months later. Cabrera suspected English influence in the hostility shown the missionaries. Threats from Cabrera led to at least the Christianized residents of the town moving south to a point west of the Flint River just above where it joins the Chattahoochee. A mission named San Carlos de Sabacola was established in the town before 1686. The mission last appears in Spanish records in 1690. The mission town may have included Chatots from the earlier mission of San Carlos de los Chacatos in present-day Jackson County, Florida.

See also
History of Georgia
Spanish missions in Florida
Viceroyalty of New Spain — Spanish colonial North America
Spanish Louisiana — colonial region

Notes

References

Sources

External links
 "Spanish Missions" in The New Georgia Encyclopedia

 
Spanish Florida
Native American history of Georgia (U.S. state)
Pre-statehood history of Georgia (U.S. state)
Colonial Mexico
Colonial United States (Spanish)
New Spain
Georgia
Spanish colonization of the Americas
Spanish Colonial architecture in the United States